United Nations Security Council Resolution 251, adopted unanimously on May 2, 1968, the Council deeply deplored Israel holding a military parade in Jerusalem in disregard of the unanimous decision adopted by the Council in resolution 250.

See also
Arab–Israeli conflict
List of United Nations Security Council Resolutions 201 to 300 (1965–1971)

References 
Text of the Resolution at undocs.org

External links
 

 0251
 0251
 0251
20th century in Jerusalem
Israeli–Palestinian conflict and the United Nations
May 1968 events